Fergania is a genus of flowering plants belonging to the family Apiaceae.

Its native range is Central Asia.

Species:
 Fergania polyantha (Korovin) Pimenov

References

Apioideae